FK Bratstvo is a Montenegrin football club based in Ljajkovići (Zeta Plain), a suburb of Podgorica. The club was founded in 1975 and currently competes in 
the Montenegrin Third League.
One of the first coaches:Terzic Slobodan

History
Founded in 1975, FK Bratstvo is a second football team from the territory of Urban Municipality of Golubovci (part of Podgorica Capital). Oldest and much successful is FK Zeta.
From their beginnings, FK Bratstvo played in the Fourth League - Central, but without any significant results during the SFR Yugoslavia era. Their first biggest success came during the 1995–96 season. FK Bratstvo won the title in the Fourth League and gained its first-ever promotion to Montenegrin Republic League.
The team spent 10 consecutive seasons in Republic League. During that time, at February 2003, FK Bratstvo made biggest result on one single game, by eliminating strongest Montenegrin side FK Budućnost from Montenegrin Republic Cup first round.
After Montenegrin independence, FK Bratstvo became a member of Montenegrin Second League. From 2007, the team was moved from the old stadium in Cijevna village to neighbouring Ljajkovići. All the time since 2006, FK Bratstvo spent in Second League.
Historical results of FK Bratstvo came on seasons 2009-10 and 2015-16, when the team finished at third place, which gained them playoffs for First League. On 2009–10 First League playoffs, FK Bratstvo lost against FK Mornar (0–1; 1–2). Six years after that, Bratstvo lost another chance for historical First League promotion, after 2015-16 playoff games against FK Iskra (2–2; 0–6).
On season 2016–17, FK Bratstvo finished as a last-placed team. So, after 11 consecutive seasons in the Second League, they were relegated to the third-tier competition.

Honours and achievements
 Montenegrin Fourth League – 1
winners (1): 1995-96

Current squad

Stadium

Until 2007, FK Bratstvo played their home games in the village of Cijevna, near the Aluminium Plant Podgorica. But, during the 2007, new stadium was built in neighbouring village Ljajkovići. Since then, FK Bratstvo plays all their games at Ljajkovići stadium.
The stadium meets criteria for Second League games, but not for top-league matches.

See also
Stadion Ljajkovići
Golubovci
Zeta Plain
Podgorica
Montenegrin Second League
Montenegrin clubs in Yugoslav football competitions (1946–2006)

References

External links
Profile by Weltfussballarchiv  

Association football clubs established in 1975
Football clubs in Podgorica
1975 establishments in Montenegro